Chi Zhiqiang (16 November 1924 – 7 January 2020) was a Chinese pharmacologist and researcher at Shanghai Institute of Materia Medica, Chinese Academy of Sciences.

Early life and education
Chi was born in Huangyan County, Zhejiang, Republic of China (1912-1949), on November 16, 1924, to Chi Yun, a surveying and mapping technician. He was the third of five children. He attended Huangyan Middle School and Zhejiang Provincial Taizhou High School. In 1943 he was accepted to Zhejiang University, where he graduated in 1949.

Career
After university, he was assigned to Zhejiang Provincial Bureau of Culture. He joined the Communist Party of China in January 1949. In July 1953 he joined the Shanghai Institute of Materia Medica, Chinese Academy of Sciences, becoming its deputy director in 1978. In 1983 he was promoted to become deputy dean of Shanghai Branch of the Chinese Academy of Sciences.

Death
On January 7, 2020, he died at Huadong Hospital, in Shanghai.

Contributions
In the early 1950s, schistosomiasis was widespread in the Yangtze River Basin, he participated in the study of schistosomiasis eradication.

Honours and awards
 1991 State Natural Science Award (Second Class)
 1997 Member of the Chinese Academy of Engineering

References

1924 births
2020 deaths
Scientists from Taizhou, Zhejiang
Zhejiang University alumni
Chinese pharmacologists
Members of the Chinese Academy of Engineering